Avalude Katha is a 1987 Indian Malayalam film, directed by Jayadevan and produced by Purushan Alappuzha. The film stars Sathaar, Anuradha and Ramu in the lead roles. The film has musical score by A. T. Ummer.

Cast
Sathaar
Anuradha
Ramu

Soundtrack
The music was composed by A. T. Ummer and the lyrics were written by Poovachal Khader.

References

External links
 

1987 films
1980s Malayalam-language films